Harold Hughes was a Welsh professional footballer who played in the Football League for Brentford, Aberdare Athletic and Merthyr Town as a forward.

Career statistics

References

Footballers from Merthyr Tydfil
Welsh footballers
Association football inside forwards
Aberdare Athletic F.C. players
Brentford F.C. players
English Football League players
Year of death missing
1902 births
Merthyr Town F.C. players